The 2010 season for the  cycling team began in January with the Tour Down Under and ended in October at the Giro di Lombardia. As a UCI ProTour team, they were automatically invited and obliged to attend every event in the ProTour.

The team's manager was former team member Erik Breukink, in his seventh season in the role. The team's ridership was almost entirely unchanged from 2009, with a small number of riders departing and the only arrivals being promotions from the Rabobank continental team.

2010 roster
Ages as of January 1, 2010.

Riders who joined the team for the 2010 season

Riders who left the team during or after the 2009 season

One-day races
Freire scored the team's first victory of the season in the Trofeo Cala Millor, part of the Vuelta a Mallorca quasi-stage race, as he outsprinted Tour Down Under stars André Greipel and Manuel Cardoso.

Spring classics

Fall races

Stage races

Grand Tours

Giro d'Italia
Menchov, the 2009 Giro d'Italia champion, announced in October 2009 that he would not defend his championship in 2010. The team thus entered the Giro without any expectations of contending for another overall victory. Mollema rode as the squad leader. Freire was supposed to start the race, with aims of winning one of the flat road race stages in the team's home country, the Netherlands, but he pulled out of the race two days before it started due to respiratory illness. Kruijswijk took Freire's place on the squad. The squad wore special jerseys for the Giro, incorporating the colors of the Italian flag and the logo for Right To Play, which the team supports. The jerseys were later auctioned off with the proceeds going to Right To Play.

As expected, the squad was active in the opening to the Giro in the Netherlands. Van Emden was ninth best in the stage 1 individual time trial, 9 seconds off Bradley Wiggins' winning time. Flens made the breakaway in stage 2, and Brown took eighth in the sprint for the finish line. The next day of racing was similar, with Stamsnijder making the morning break and Brown finishing second just behind Wouter Weylandt in the sprint. Weening was tenth in the overall standings prior to the transfer to Italy, 16 seconds behind the race leader. Brown led the points classification and wore the red jersey at this point. The squad was 11th in the stage 4 team time trial, just over a minute of 's winning pace. Brown was one of the many sprinters upset by a three-rider breakaway just surviving to the finish in stage 5. He was seventh on this stage, but lost the red jersey to Jérôme Pineau who was up the road in the breakaway and won the stage. Van Emden contested the depleted group sprint in stage 9, finishing ninth.

The squad was then quiet for several days, but in the final stages in the Dolomites both Mollema and Kruijswijk turned in solid rides. In stage 14, which went over Monte Grappa, Mollema rode with the second group on the road, finishing the stage seventh. Kruijswijk made a winning breakaway three stages later and had a chance for victory at Pejo Terme. Kruijswijk, Danilo Hondo, and Damien Monier were the last three riders together at the head of the race and finished well clear of the others. Monier soloed to victory more than 30 seconds ahead, and Hondo left Kruijswijk behind in the stage's final kilometer, leaving him third. Brown contested the sprint in stage 18, the Giro's last mass finish, coming away sixth. Mollema was eighth in the Giro's most climbing-intensive day, stage 20, riding the Passo di Gavia and Passo del Tonale with or near the Giro elite. In the final day's time trial, Stamsnijder took tenth. Despite not expecting their squad to contend in the overall standings, Rabobank was one of only three squads (the others being  and ) to finish with three riders in the top 20 overall. These were Mollema in 12th, Ardila in 15th, and Kruijswijk in 18th. Stamsnijder won the Giro's TV classification for intermediate sprints (TV being short for traguardo volante, or "flying sprint"). The squad also placed well in both teams classifications, finishing second in the Trofeo Fast Team and third in the Trofeo Super Team.

Tour de France
Menchov and Gesink co-captained the squad sent to the Tour de France. Menchov was often mentioned as a contender for overall victory, as he sought the Tour title to complete the career sweep of the Grand Tours. Menchov had fallen ill in May at the Tour de Romandie, but reported regaining his strength during the Critérium du Dauphiné and believed himself to be in optimal form for the Tour. Freire was also named to the squad, with the intention of acting as a free agent (a sprinter without his own leadout train) in the flat stages. The team hoped for a mountain stage win and possibly a high overall placing from Gesink.

The team was mostly quiet in the race's first week. Menchov rode poorly in the prologue time trial, nearly a minute off the winning time of Fabian Cancellara and five seconds worse than Gesink, despite the fact that Menchov is generally the far superior time trialist. In stage 2, when dozens of riders from nearly every team crashed on a slippery descent of the Col du Stockeu in Spa, Gesink crashed and broke a bone in his right arm. It was reported as likely that he would withdraw from the Tour, but he rode on. Freire had difficulties in the early flat stages, tenth in stage 4 the closest he came to a victory.

In stage 7 to Station des Rousses in the Jura, the first stage with any significant quantity of climbing, Menchov and Gesink both finished with the peloton, a result which moved Menchov into tenth overall after being distant in the overall classification to that point. The next day, in a more climbing-intensive stage, Menchov and Gesink finished with the second group on the road, ceding 10 seconds to Andy Schleck and Samuel Sánchez but gaining time against everyone else in the race. This result moved Menchov up to fifth overall, and Gesink to 11th, up from 23rd. In the next stage, one which featured one of the Tour's hardest climbs, the Col de la Madeleine, Menchov and Gesink rode most of the stage together. They lost two minutes to Schleck and Alberto Contador and effectively any chance to win the race, and also lost one minute and ten seconds to Sánchez, but gained time against nearly everyone else in the race. They occupied fourth (Menchov) and seventh (Gesink) after the stage. During stage 14, Menchov and Sánchez pulled back 14 seconds from Schleck and Contador, after the two leaders engaged in a bizarre seeming track stand during the stage's final climb to Ax-3-Domaines. They still sat over two minutes behind them in the overall classification, an effectively insurmountable time gap. Gesink also passed Levi Leipheimer in this stage to move up to sixth overall, as the American lost 45 seconds to Gesink's group.

In stage 15, Menchov and Sánchez were tangentially involved in the day's greater controversy. While the group of overall favorites was climbing the hors catégorie Port de Balès, the chain on race leader Schleck's bicycle slipped. At the exact moment that happened, Contador attacked and got clear of the group. While Schleck was unable to respond due to his mechanical trouble, Menchov and Sánchez, along with five others, followed Contador and finished 39 seconds clear of the Luxembourger, though their positions relative to both of the leading riders was essentially unchanged. In the race's queen stage, stage 17 ending at the Col du Tourmalet, Menchov and Gesink again finished together. The lost a minute and 40 seconds to Schleck and Contador, who finished together at the head of the race, and eight seconds to Sánchez. This gave Sánchez a 21-second lead over Menchov for the third step on the podium, but with a  individual time trial still to contest, Menchov had good odds of overtaking him. During that time trial, a drastic change in wind direction occurred. This made it so earlier starters posted considerably better times than those who came later. Contador, for example, who had won the long time trial in the 2009 Tour de France, was 35th on the day, 5 minutes and 43 seconds off the pace. Menchov, however, was 11th, taking time out of nearly every other rider in the race. The result moved him up to third overall, a position he held in the Tour's largely ceremonial finale the next day. The squad finished third in the teams classification.

Vuelta a España

Season victories

Footnotes

References

2010 road cycling season by team
2010
2010 in Dutch sport